Insider Pages is an online "local search" service operated by IAC. Insider Pages was founded by Stuart MacFarlane and Sean Olson in 2004.

Before its acquisition by IAC the company was based in Redwood Shores, California, and had over 600,000 reviews of local merchants around the country. On March 27, 2006, the company announced an $8.5 million investment by Sequoia Capital, Softbank Capital, and Idealab.  The company addressed a demographic (by its description) of young and middle-aged families who own homes in urban and suburban areas.

After laying off two-thirds of its staff  in January 2007, they were acquired (for an undisclosed amount) by IAC, operators of Citysearch, in March 2007.  As part of IAC, Insider Pages has grown significantly and now has more than 1.5 million user generated reviews and receives over 5 million unique visitors each month. In November 2007, Insider Pages launched the Insider Pages Fundraiser program to allow groups to write reviews to receive funding.

In 2019, IAC sold its CityGrid Media division, including Insider Pages, to eLocal.

Further reading

References 

American review websites
Companies based in San Francisco
IAC (company)